Meyer Dolinsky (October 13, 1923 in Chicago, Illinois – February 29, 1984 in Los Angeles, California), aka Mike Dolinsky (sometimes credited as "Michael Adams" or "Mike Adams"), was an American screenwriter. Before transitioning to the screen, he wrote radio scripts.

Books
Mind One (1972), Dell Books,

Radio Scripts

Filmography

Films

Television

References

External links

1923 births
1984 deaths
American male screenwriters
Male actors from Chicago
20th-century American male actors
Screenwriters from Illinois
20th-century American male writers
20th-century American screenwriters